Gremyachinsk is a rural locality (a selo) in Pribaykalsky District, Republic of Buryatia, Russia. The population was 846 as of 2010. There are 21 streets.

Geography 
Gremyachinsk is located 88 km north of Turuntayevo (the district's administrative centre) by road. Kotokel is the nearest rural locality.

References 

Rural localities in Okinsky District
Populated places on Lake Baikal